Norman Vincent Peale (May 31, 1898 – December 24, 1993) was an American Protestant clergyman, and an author best known for popularizing the concept of positive thinking, especially through his best-selling book The Power of Positive Thinking (1952). He served as the pastor of Marble Collegiate Church, New York, from 1932, leading this Reformed Church in America congregation for more than a half century until his retirement in 1984. Alongside his pulpit ministry, he had an extensive career of writing and editing, and radio and television presentations. Despite arguing at times against involvement of clergy in politics, he nevertheless had some controversial affiliations with politically active organizations in the late 1930s, and engaged with national political candidates and their campaigns, having influence on some, including a personal friendship with President Richard Nixon.

Peale led a group opposing the election of John F. Kennedy for president, saying, "Faced with the election of a Catholic, our culture is at stake." Theologian Reinhold Niebuhr responded that Peale was motivated by "blind prejudice," and facing intense public criticism, Peale retracted his statement. He also opposed Adlai Stevenson's candidacy for president because he was divorced, which led Stevenson to famously quip "I find Saint Paul appealing and Saint Peale appalling."

Following the publication of Peale's 1952 best seller, his ideas became the focus of criticism from several psychiatric professionals, church theologians and leaders. Peale was awarded the Presidential Medal of Freedom, the highest civilian honor in the United States, on March 26, 1984, by President Ronald Reagan. He died at age 95, following a stroke, on December 24, 1993, in Pawling, New York. He was survived by Ruth Stafford, his wife of 63 years, who had influenced him with regard to the publication of The Power in 1952, and with whom he had founded Guideposts in 1945; Ruth died on February 6, 2008, at the age of 101.

Early life and education

Peale was born in Bowersville, Ohio on May 31, 1898, the eldest of three sons of Charles and Anna (née Delaney) Peale, Charles a physician-turned-Methodist minister in southern Ohio, and as such, he and his brothers were raised as Methodists.

Peale graduated from Bellefontaine High School, Bellefontaine, Ohio. He attended and earned a degree at Ohio Wesleyan University, where he became a brother at the Phi Gamma Delta fraternity. He also began to attend Boston University School of Theology.

Career

Beginnings

Serving as a pulpit replacement in a subsequent summer break (for an Ohio church pastor that had fallen ill), the Boston theology trainee was persuaded by his father to abandon the formal preaching style of his training for one of simplicity, which led Peale to talk about "Jesus Christ... relat[ing him] to the simplicities of human lives," and which led, he would later recollect, to a "good reception" and "look[s] of gratitude and goodness" on the faces of congregants. Leaving school thereafter to earn needed funds, Peale would work in journalism at The Detroit Journal, after a year of reporting in Findlay, Ohio at The Morning Republican. Leaving journalism, Peale returned his focus to ministry, and in 1922 was ordained a pastor in the Methodist Episcopal Church. After a first assignment in Rhode Island, at an unknown church in Berkeley, he accepted a call to Brooklyn, where, in 1924, his work from the pulpit and in general added to its membership more than twenty-fold within a year, leading the small congregation to build a new church.

He received a call to Syracuse, New York and in 1927 took the pulpit at the University Methodist Church; it was also while there that he became one of the first American clergymen to bring his sermons to the emerging commercial technology of radio, a media decision that added to his general popularity, and that he would later extend in the same way to television. During the Depression, Peale teamed up with J.C. Penney & Co. founder James Cash Penney, radio personality Arthur Godfrey, and IBM founder and President Thomas J. Watson, forming (and sitting the first board of) 40Plus, an organization aimed at helping unemployed managers and executives. On June 20, 1930, Peale married Loretta Ruth Stafford.

In 1932 or 1933 he was called to the Marble Collegiate Church in New York City, a call which required that he "switch his denomination"—for a clergyman, transfer his ordination—to the Reformed Church in America, "a transfer made... with no apparent problem for him". His tenure at Marble Collegiate Church, which dated to 1628 and was "said to be the oldest continuous Protestant congregation in the country", began with an attendance at service of 200, but which would grow to thousands, as a result of his "spirited sermons". Peale would remain at Marble until his retirement from pastoral work, in 1984.

His theology was controversial, and prominent theologians such as Ronald Niebuhr and William Miller spoke out publicly against it. They contended that Peale's theology falsely represented Christianity and that Peale's writings and sermons were factually false as well. Niebuhr said "This new cult is dangerous. Anything which corrupts the Gospel hurts Christianity. And it hurts people too." William Miller Wrote that Peale's theology is "hard on the truth," full of undocumented claims, and after reviewing Peale's entire library of books, said "the later ones are worse."

Early association with psychiatry
Following the 1929 market crash, and being presented with congregants with "complex problems" (as Peale would later recount), his wife, Ruth Stafford Peale, who went by Ruth, counseled him to "fin[d] a psychiatrist who could help parish members," which he did through consultation with his physician, Clarence W. Lieb. Peale was introduced to a Freudian who had trained in psychiatry in Vienna, Smiley Blanton, who Peale later recalled as saying, "I've been praying for years that some minister would see that psychiatry and religion... should work together" (in response to being asked about his believing in the "power of prayer").

The two men wrote books together, notably Faith Is the Answer: A Psychiatrist and a Pastor Discuss Your Problems (1940). The book was written in alternating chapters, with Blanton writing one chapter, then Peale. Blanton espoused no particular religious point of view in his chapters. In 1951 this clinic of psychotherapy and religion grew into the American Foundation of Religion and Psychiatry, with Peale serving as president and Blanton as executive director. Blanton handled difficult psychiatric cases and Peale, who had no mental health credentials, handled religious issues.

When Peale came under heavy criticism from the mental health community for his book The Power of Positive Thinking (1952), Blanton distanced himself from Peale and refused to publicly endorse the book. Blanton did not allow Peale to use his name in The Power of Positive Thinking and declined to defend Peale publicly when he came under criticism. As scholar Donald Meyer describes it: "Peale evidently imagined that he marched with Blanton in their joint labors in the Religio-psychiatric Institute. This was not exactly so.": 266  Meyer notes that Blanton's own book, Love or Perish (1956), "contrasted so distinctly at so many points with the Peale evangel" of "positive thinking" that these works had virtually nothing in common.: 273

Radio and publishing
In the same period, Peale returned to the radio work that he began in Syracuse, as a means to deal with what he termed a personal obsession, "reach[ing] as many people as I could with the message of Jesus Christ." His first programs in New York City began in 1935, an effort which led to the National Council of Churches sponsoring a program on the NBC Radio Network entitled The Art of Living, which would grow to reach millions.

This title then became the same as first of his books from New York City, in 1937, from Abingdon Press, which spoke of a power that individuals had within themselves that they could "tap" through "applied Christianity". With the advent of war in 1939, his second book appeared from Abingdon, "You Can Win, which spoke of the tensions of life, the possibility of self-mastery, and ones being one unconquerable with God. Despite a clear and apparent philosophy and message, the books did not "advis[e] people how to apply [the ideas] to their lives," and they did not sell well. (Some of his other works include The Tough-Minded Optimist, and Inspiring Messages for Daily Living.) By the end of World War II in 1945, Peale, his wife Ruth, and Raymond Thornburg (a businessman from Pawling, New York), had founded Guideposts magazine, a non-denominational forum that presented inspirational stories.

With the end of the war—which was marked, in the words of George Vecsey, writing in The New York Times, by Americans having "some leeway to question what they believed and how they should live"—Peale achieved his first best seller, published with Prentice-Hall in 1948, a self-help book entitled A Guide for Confident Living that brought religion to bear on personal problems. This was followed soon thereafter by the book for which he is most widely know, The Power of Positive Thinking; as Vecsey describes it, it arose from a draft book that Ruth Peale "sent to [an] editor without her husband's knowledge", and this usurpation led to a book that would remain on best seller lists for more than three years, which "rank[ed] it... behind the Bible... as one of the highest-selling spiritual books in history".

Vecsey was careful to categorize Peale's book as a best seller in the narrow "spiritual books" category rather than comparing it to the much larger sales figures of the non-fiction or self-help categories. First published in 1952, it stayed on the New York Times bestseller list for 186 consecutive weeks, and according to the publisher, Simon and Schuster, the book has sold around 5 million copies. The fact that the book has sold 5 million copies is printed on the cover of the current edition in both paperback and hard cover, and directly contradicts exaggerated claims that the book has sold more than 20 million copies in 42 languages. The publisher also contradicts the translation claim, saying the book has been translated into only 15 languages. Nearly half of the sales of the book (2.1 mil.) occurred before 1958, and by 1963, the book had still only sold 2 million copies according to Peale. Since then, the book has sold less than 3 million copies over the past 60 years. Some of his other popular works include The Art of Living, A Guide to Confident Living, The Tough-Minded Optimist, and Inspiring Messages for Daily Living.

The Peale radio program, The Art of Living, was ongoing, and would continue for 54 years, and under the continued and evolving sponsorship of the National Council of Churches, he moved into television when the new medium arrived. In the meantime he continued to write books and to edit Guideposts magazine. As well, his sermons went out monthly to an extensive mailing list.

Organizations

In 1947 Peale and educator Kenneth Beebe co-founded The Horatio Alger Association, an organisation that aimed to recognize and honor Americans successful in spite of difficult circumstances. Other organizations founded by Peale include the Peale Center, the Positive Thinking Foundation, and Guideposts Publications, all of which aim to promote Peale's theories about positive thinking.

Personal life
Peale was close to President Richard Nixon's family, and officiated at the 1968 wedding of Julie Nixon and David Eisenhower. He continued calling at the White House throughout the Watergate crisis, and was quoted as saying "Christ didn't shy away from people in trouble."

Peale was a 33-degree Freemason of the Scottish Rite.

Later life
President Ronald Reagan awarded Peale the Presidential Medal of Freedom (the highest civilian honor in the United States) on March 26, 1984, for his contributions to the field of theology.

Peale died at age 95 following a stroke, on December 24, 1993, in Pawling, New York He was survived by his wife of 63 years, Ruth Stafford Peale, who had influenced him with regard to the publication of The Power in 1952, and with regard to his early interactions with psychiatry, and with whom he had founded Guideposts (of which she was chairman emeritus, and which had an annual readership of 8 million in 2008); Ruth would pass away more than a decade later, on February 6, 2008, at the age of 101.

Criticism and controversies

General and psychological critique
Peale's works were criticized by several mental health experts who denounced his writings as bad for mental health, and concluded that Peale was a "con man and a fraud," and a "Confidence Man." These critics appeared in the early 1950s after the publication of The Power of Positive Thinking.

One critique of The Power of Positive Thinking noted that the book contained anecdotes that are hard to substantiate. Critics noted many of the testimonials that Peale quoted as supporting his philosophy were unnamed, unknown and unsourced. Examples included a "famous psychologist,"  a two-page letter from a "practicing physician",  another "famous psychologist", a "prominent citizen of New York City", and dozens, if not hundreds, more unverifiable quotations. Similar scientific studies of questionable validity are also cited. As psychiatrist R.C. Murphy wrote, "All this advertising is vindicated as it were, by a strict cleaving to the side of part truth," and referred to the work and the quoted material as "implausible and woodenly pious". Peale's works were criticized by several mental health experts who declared his writings were actually bad for mental health, concluding that Peale was a "con man and a fraud," with his being referred to as a confidence man in the popular press in 1955.

Agreeing with Murphy is William Lee Miller, a professor at the University of Virginia, who wrote an extensive article called “Some Negative Thinking About Norman Vincent Peale.” After reviewing the entire Peale library, Miller concluded that the books “are hard on the truth,” and that “the later books are worse” than the earlier ones. Miller challenged the plausibility and truthfulness of Peale's testimonials with “Great Men” in his books, almost all of whom were unnamed, unknown and unverifiable. “In Dr. Peale’s books these men turn out to talk just like Dr. Peale…. There is a continuing recurring episode in his books that goes like this: Peale meets Great Man; Peale humbly asks Great Man for his secret (his formula, technique); Great Man tells Peale his strikingly Peale-like secret (formula, technique)….”Miller also mocks the success formulas these “great men” reveal, such as the unnamed newspaper editor who credits repeating a single phrase [a technique in auto-hypnosis] as the reason for his success. The unnamed editor's “secret is card in wallet with words to the effect that successful man is successful.” Miller explains, “There is never the suggestion that hard work might be involved in achievement. There are no demands on the reader.” Miller wrote “All this is hard on the truth, but it is good for the preacher’s popularity. It enables him to say exactly what his hearers want to hear.” Miller further mocks Peale's claims that his methods of “religion” are scientifically proven. Miller quotes Peale: “The laws are so precise and have been so often demonstrated… that religion may be said to form an exact science.” Peale provides no scientific evidence in his books to support this claim. He provides no evidence that his methods and “techniques” have been scientifically tested or proven to work. Miller goes on to note that there are no scientific references supporting Peale, no footnotes, no index, no bibliography, no recommendations for further readings, almost no evidence of any kind presented in the Peale books. Miller concluded that the Peale claims were untruthful and unsupported by evidence. Miller wrote that in order to gain followers “He [Peale] is willing to use without flinching the most blatant appeals and to promise without stint.”

A second critique of Peale was that he attempted to conceal that his techniques for giving the reader absolute self-confidence and deliverance from suffering are a well known form of hypnosis, and that he persuaded his readers to follow his beliefs through a combination of false evidence and self-hypnosis (autosuggestion), disguised by the use of terms which may sound more benign from the reader's point of view ("techniques", "formulas", "methods", "prayers", and "prescriptions"). One author called Peale's book "The Bible of American autohypnotism". While his techniques have been debated by psychologists, Peale said his theological practice and strategy was directed more at self-analysis, forgiveness, character development, and growth which has been suggested by some to be much like the teachings of the Jesuits of the Catholic Church.

Psychiatrist R. C. Murphy wrote "Self knowledge, in Mr. Peale's understanding is unequivocally bad: self hypnosis is good." Murphy added that repeated hypnosis defeats an individual's self-motivation, self-knowledge, unique sense of self, sense of reality, and ability to think critically. Murphy describes Peale's understanding of the mind as inaccurate, "without depth", and his description of the workings of the mind and the unconscious as deceptively simplistic and false: "It is the very shallowness of his concept of 'person' that makes his rules appear easy ... If the unconscious of man ... can be conceptualized as a container for a small number of psychic fragments, then ideas like 'mind-drainage' follow. So does the reliance on self-hypnosis, which is the cornerstone of Mr. Peale's philosophy.'"

Psychologist Albert Ellis, founder of the branch of psychology known as cognitive psychology, compared the Peale techniques with those of French psychologist, hypnotherapist and pharmacist Émile Coué, and Ellis said that the repeated use of these hypnotic techniques could lead to significant mental health problems. Ellis, ranked by the American Psychological Association as the second most influential psychologist of the 20th century (behind Carl Rogers, but ahead of Sigmund Freud), documented in several of his books the many individuals he has treated who suffered mental breakdowns from following Peale's teachings. Ellis described one of his case studies: "One of my 50-year-old clients, Sidney, read everything that Norman Vincent Peale ever wrote, went to many of his sermons at Marble Collegiate Church, and turned many of his friends onto trusting completely in God and in the Reverend Peale to cure them of all their ills. When some of these friends, in spite of their vigorous positive thinking, wound up in the mental hospital, and when Sidney had to turn to massive doses of tranquilizers to keep himself going, he became disillusioned..." Fortunately, Ellis' client began attending therapy and workshop groups at his clinic (The Albert Ellis Institute), and through cognitive behavioral therapy (at that time, known as Rational Emotive Behavioral Therapy, or REBT), he was able to improve his mental health and reduce his medications. Ellis' writings repeatedly warn the public not to follow the Peale message. Ellis contends the Peale approach is dangerous, distorted, unrealistic. He compares the black or white view of life that Peale teaches to a psychological disorder (borderline personality disorder), perhaps implying that dangerous mental habits which he sees in the disorder may be brought on by following the teaching. "In the long run [Peale's teachings] lead to failure and disillusionment, and not only boomerang back against people, but often prejudice them against effective therapy."

A third critique was that Peale's philosophy was based on exaggerating the fears of his readers and followers, and that this exaggerated fear inevitably leads to aggression and the destruction of those considered "negative". Peale's views were critically reviewed in a 1955 article by psychiatrist R. C. Murphy, published in The Nation, titled "Think Right: Reverend Peale's Panacea".

Donald B. Meyer seemed to agree with this assessment, presenting similar warnings of a religious nature. In his article "Confidence Man", Meyer wrote, "In more classic literature, this sort of pretension to mastery has often been thought to indicate an alliance with a Lower rather than a Higher power." The mastery Peale speaks of is not the mastery of skills or tasks, but the mastery of fleeing and avoiding one's own "negative thoughts". Meyer wrote, exaggerated fear inevitably leads to aggression: "Battle it is; Peale, in sublime betrayal of the aggression within his philosophy of peace, talks of 'shooting' prayers at people."

Psychologist Martin Seligman, former APA president and the founder of the branch of psychology known as Positive Psychology, differentiated Peale's positive thinking from his own positive psychology, while acknowledging their common roots.

Seligman went on to say "Positive thinking often involves trying to believe upbeat statements such as 'Every day, in every way, I am getting better and better,' in the absence of evidence or even in the face of contrary evidence. ... Learned optimism, in contrast, is about accuracy".

Another difference experts noted was that though Seligman describes his positive psychology as a self-empowering program completely within the ability of the individual to achieve on his or her own, experts described positive thinking as disempowering to the individual and a religion of weakness, where individuals are told by Peale they cannot overcome their negative circumstances without his autosuggestive "techniques," which he claims will give them the power of God. As Meyer quotes Peale as saying, "No man, however resourceful or pugnacious, is a match for so great an adversary as a hostile world. He is at best a puny and impotent creature quite at the mercy of the cosmic and social forces in the midst of which he dwells." Meyer noted that Peale always "reacted to the image of harshness with flight rather than competitive fight", and the only solution Peale offers out of this state of helplessness are his autosuggestive "techniques", which he claims will give people the power of God. Meyer adds that the proof that positive thinking cannot work is that according to Peale, even with God's power on one's side, one still cannot face negative reality, which is always stronger.

Meyer, like Seligman, noted that such unrealistic thinking by a positive thinker could easily be fatal.

Faith that you could defeat an opponent who could run faster than you would be contemptible since it could only mean you expected God to lend you power He refused to lend your opponent or that you hoped your opponent lacked self-knowledge, lacked faith, and hence failed to use his real powers. Such faith could be fatal if it led you into competitions it would be fatal to lose. As for those competitions where luck or accident or providence might decide, certainly the faith which looked to luck or accident or providence would be contemptible, and also possibly fatal.

Theological critique 
Episcopal Church theologian and later bishop, John M. Krumm, criticized Peale and the "heretical character" of his teaching on positive thinking. Krumm cites "the emphasis upon techniques such as the repetition of confident phrases... or the manipulation of certain mechanical devices", which he says "gives the impression of a thoroughly depersonalized religion. Very little is said about the sovereign mind and purpose of God; much is made of the things men can say to themselves and can do to bring about their ambitions and purposes." Krumm cautions that "The predominant use of impersonal symbols for God is a serious and dangerous invitation to regard man as the center of reality and the Divine Reality as an impersonal power, the use and purpose of which is determined by the man who takes hold of it and employs it as he thinks best."

Theologian Reinhold Niebuhr, professor of applied Christianity at the Union Theological Seminary, reported similar concerns about positive thinking. "This new cult is dangerous. Anything which corrupts the gospel hurts Christianity. And it hurts people too. It helps them to feel good while they are evading the real issues of life."

Liston Pope, dean of Yale Divinity School, agreed with Neibuhr. "There is nothing humble or pious in the view this cult takes of God. God becomes sort of a master psychiatrist who will help you get out of your difficulties. The formulas and the constant reiteration of such themes as "You and God can do anything" are very nearly blasphemous."

G. Bromley Oxnam, a Methodist bishop in Washington D.C., also weighed in. "When you are told that if you follow seven easy rules you will become president of your company, you are being kidded. There just aren't that many openings. This kind of preaching is making Christianity a cult of success."

A. Powell Davies, pastor of All Souls' Unitarian Church, Washington D.C., added his view:

It has sort of a drug effect on people to be told they need not worry. They keep coming back for more. It keeps their minds on a superficial level and encourages emotional dependency. It is an escape from reality. People under stress do one of two things; seek shelter or respond to harsh reality by a deeper recognition of what they are up against. The people who flock to the 'peace of mind' preachers are seeking shelter. They don't want to face reality.

William Lee Miller, professor in religious studies at the University of Virginia, expressed similar concerns: "The absolute power that Dr. Peale's followers insist on granting to their Positive Thinking may betray, however, a note of desperation. The optimism is no longer the healthy-minded kind, looking at life whole and seeing it good, but an optimism arranged by a very careful and very anxious selection of the particular bits and pieces of reality one is willing to acknowledge. It is not the response of an expanding epoch when failure, loneliness, death, war, taxes, and the limitations and fragmentariness of all human striving are naturally far from consciousness, but of an anxious time when they are all too present in consciousness and must be thrust aside with slogans and "formulas," assaulted with clenched fists and gritted teeth, and battered down with the insistence on the power of Positive Thinking. The success striving is different, too. The Horatio Alger type seems to have had a simple, clear confidence in getting ahead by mastering a craft, by inventing something out in the barn, or by doing an outstanding job as office boy. The Peale fan has no such confidence and trusts less in such solid realities as ability and work and talent than in the ritual repetition of spirit lifters and thought conditioners written on cards and on the determined refusal to think gloomy thoughts.

In spite of the attacks, Peale did not resign from his church, though he repeatedly threatened that he would. He also never directly challenged or rebutted his critics. Meanwhile, his book The Power of Positive Thinking had stopped selling by 1958. As Donald Meyer noted,

Religious scholars, however, warned the public not to believe Peale just because he was a minister. They said the Peale message was not only factually false but also misrepresented Christianity. Reinhold Niebuhr told the public the Peale message was "a partial picture of Christianity, a sort of half-truth", and added "The basic sin of this cult is its egocentricity. It puts 'self' instead of the cross at the center of the picture". Edmund Fuller, novelist, book critic, and book review editor of the Episcopal Churchnews took it a step further. "The Peale products and their like are equated blatantly with Christian teaching and preaching. They are represented as a revival or response in Christianity with which they have no valid connection. They influence, mislead and often disillusion sick, maladjusted, unhappy or ill-constructed people, obscuring for them the Christian realities. They offer easy comforts, easy solutions to problems and mysteries that sometimes perhaps, have no comforts or solutions at all, in glib, worldly terms. They offer a cheap 'happiness' in lieu of the joy Christianity can offer, sometimes in the midst of suffering. The panacea of positive thinking has been called by qualified people a positive hazard to the delicate marginal areas of mental health".

Meyer noted Peale's influence over his followers began when "Peale had 'discovered' the power of suggestion over the human mind, and therewith, had caught up with Henry Wood, Charles Fillmore, and Emmett Fox, sixty forty and twenty years before him. He was teaching Mental Photography all over again. Thoughts were things". Meyer described Peale's religion: "Peale's aim in preaching positive thinking was not that of inducing contemplative states of Oneness nor of advancing self-insight nor of strengthening conscious will, let alone sensitizing people to their world. The clue lay here in Peale's reiterated concern that the operation of his positive thoughts and thought conditioners become 'automatic', that the individual truly become 'conditioned ...' But was the automated power of positive thinking liberty or just one more form of mind-cure hypnotism? Was this new power really health or simply further weakness disguised?" After considering all points of view, Meyer answered his own questions, and concluded positive thinking was a religion of "weakness". "Peale's phenomenal popularity represented a culture in impasse. The psychology for which the cult was also religion culminated the treatment of weakness by weakness".

Political controversies

Peale and rightist/anti-semitic claims

For a time, Peale was acting Chairman and Secretary of the National Committee to Uphold Constitutional Government (NCUCG), a pressure group opposed to Franklin Roosevelt's policies. In 1938, he was summoned by a Senate Committee Investigating Lobbying Activities, to answer questions concerning the NCUCG's activities.

Also. late in 1938, Peale appeared with Elizabeth Dilling, the Reverend Edward Lodge Curran, Francisco Franco, and other figures at a "Mass Meeting and Pro-American Rally" (on October 30), at the Commodore Hotel in New York; this event was later described by Arthur Derounian (John Roy Carlson) in his 1943 book Under Cover. Rev. Curran was a known supporter of Franco and other right-wing causes, as well as being "an anti‐communist and... an advocate of the, 'social justice' credo of Father [Charles] Coughlin, who was eventually ordered, off the air by his superiors" (and who Peale had earlier called out and harshly criticized for his "bizarre demogogy" in 1935). Peale claimed to have been distressed by Derounian's book, that he had been badgered into giving the convocation (a pre-meeting prayer) by a parishioner, and that he had no idea of the nature of the rally. He further claimed to be particularly distressed at the association with Dilling. He considered but as was advised against filing a defamation case against the publisher, Putnam's, as it was not feasible given the fact that he had in fact delivered the convocation as described.

In 1943, after the U.S. entry into World War II, Peale preached a sermon denouncing antisemitism and demanding that the government and church take steps to "stamp it out." As late as 1944, Peale was still described as the Chairman of the Committee for Constitutional Government, and had his signature appended to its publications.

Peale and Adlai Stevenson
Peale is also remembered in politics because of the Adlai Stevenson quote: "I find Saint Paul appealing and Saint Peale appalling." The origin of the quote can be traced back to the 1952 election, when Stevenson was informed by a reporter that Peale was accusing him of being unfit for the presidency because he was divorced. Later during his 1956 campaign for president against Dwight Eisenhower, Stevenson was introduced at a speech with: "Gov. Stevenson, we want to make it clear you are here as a courtesy because Dr. Norman Vincent Peale has instructed us to vote for your opponent." Stevenson stepped to the podium and quipped, "Speaking as a Christian, I find the Apostle Paul appealing and the Apostle Peale appalling." In 1960 a reporter asked Stevenson about a comment in which he denounced Peale for accusing John F. Kennedy of being unfit for the presidency because he was Catholic, to which Stevenson responded: "Yes, you can say that I find Paul appealing and Peale appalling."

Stevenson continued to lampoon Peale on the campaign trail in speeches for Kennedy. Though Richard Nixon and other Republicans tried to distance themselves from the furor which was caused by Peale's anti-Catholic stance, Democrats did not let voters forget it. President Harry Truman, for one, accused Nixon of tacitly approving Peale's anti-Catholic sentiment, and it remained a hot issue on the campaign trail. Regarding Peale's intrusion into Republican politics, Stevenson said in this transcript of a speech given in San Francisco: "Richard Nixon has tried to step aside in favor of Norman Vincent Peale (APPLAUSE, LAUGHTER) ... We can only surmise that Mr. Nixon has been reading 'The Power of Positive Thinking.' (APPLAUSE). America was not built by wishful thinking. It was built by realists, and it will not be saved by guess work and self-deception. It will only be saved by hard work and facing the facts."

At a later date, according to one report, Stevenson and Peale met, and Stevenson apologized to Peale for any personal pain which his comments might have caused Peale, though Stevenson never publicly recanted the substance of his statements. There is no record of Peale apologizing to Stevenson for his attacks on Stevenson. It has been argued that even Peale's "positive thinking" message was by implication politically conservative: "The underlying assumption of Peale's teaching was that nearly all basic problems were personal."

Peale and John F. Kennedy
Peale was invited to attend a strategy conference of about 30 Evangelicals in Montreux, Switzerland, by its host, the well-known evangelist Billy Graham, in mid-August 1960. There they agreed to kick off a group called The National Conference of Citizens for Religious Freedom in Washington the following month. On September 7, Peale served as its chairman and spoke for 150 Protestant clergymen, opposing the election of John F. Kennedy as president. "Faced with the election of a Catholic," Peale declared, "our culture is at stake."

In a written manifesto, Peale and his group also declared that Kennedy would serve the interests of the Catholic Church before he would serve the interests of the United States: "It is inconceivable that a Roman Catholic president would not be under extreme pressure by the hierarchy of his church to accede to its policies with respect to foreign interests," and the election of a Catholic might even end free speech in America.

Protestant theologian Reinhold Niebuhr responded, "Dr. Peale and his associates ... show blind prejudice." Protestant Episcopal Bishop James Pike echoed Niebuhr: "Any argument which would rule out a Roman Catholic just because he is Roman Catholic is both bigotry and a violation of the constitutional guarantee of no religious test for public office." Peale's statement was also condemned by former President Harry Truman, the Board of Rabbis, and other leading Protestants such as Paul Tillich and John C. Bennett. Peale recanted his statements and he was later fired by his own committee. As conservative William F. Buckley described the fallout: "When ... The Norman Vincent Peale Committee was organized, on the program that a vote for Kennedy was a vote to repeal the First Amendment to the Constitution, the Jesuits fired their Big Bertha, and Dr. Peale fled from the field, mortally wounded." Peale subsequently went into hiding and threatened to resign from his church. The fallout continued as Peale was condemned in a statement by one hundred religious leaders and dropped as a syndicated columnist by a dozen newspapers.

Influence 
Five U.S, presidents (Richard Nixon, Gerald Ford, Jimmy Carter, Ronald Reagan, and George H. W. Bush) spoke well of Peale in the documentary about his life, Positive Thinking: The Norman Vincent Peale Story.

The Reverend Billy Graham said at the National Council of Churches on June 12, 1966, that "I don't know of anyone who had done more for the kingdom of God than Norman and Ruth Peale or have meant any more in my life for the encouragement they have given me." Mary L. Trump in Too Much and Never Enough wrote that Donald Trump's father, Fred Trump, was heavily influenced by Peale.

As a child, Donald Trump attended Marble Collegiate Church with his parents, Fred and Mary. Both he and his two sisters, Maryanne and Elizabeth, were married there. Trump has repeatedly praised Peale and cited him as a formative influence.

Scott Adams, creator of Dilbert, says Peale's writing influenced him to achieve success.

At the invitation of Robert R. Spitzer, former under-secretary in the Ford administration, Peale, accompanied by his wife, Ruth, spoke several times to the student leaders at MSOE University prior to passing in 1993, influencing engineers, technical writers, managers, and architects for decades who today serve as executives in companies like GE, Nvidia, and many others.

Cultural references

Dated entries
 Peale is sarcastically referred to as a "deep philosopher" in the 1959 Tom Lehrer song "It Makes a Fellow Proud to Be a Soldier" (on the album An Evening Wasted With Tom Lehrer).
 Peale was the subject of the 1964 feature film, One Man's Way, starring Don Murray.
 A clip of Peale's radio program is heard briefly in the 1975 film Grey Gardens.
 In the 2004 Niels Mueller film, The Assassination of Richard Nixon, the Jack Jones character played by Jack Thompson tries to convince his employee Samuel J. Bicke (Sean Penn), a disillusioned salesman with a history of short-lived jobs, to truly believe in the products he is selling, and to follow the concept of positive thinking, he asking his son to give Bicke a couple of books, one of which is Peale's 1952 The Power....
 Peale appears as a character in the 2006 Grey Gardens musical, based on the eponymous 1975 film.
 A widely reprinted editorial in the Los Angeles Times stated that the 2006 book and DVD The Secret both borrow on Peale's ideas, and that The Secret suffers from some of the same weaknesses as Peale's works.

Undated entries

 The M*A*S*H episode "The Smell of Music" portrays a wounded soldier, Jordan Clarke, who rejects counsel from Col. Sherman Potter (Harry Morgan), saying, "Doc, if there's one thing I don't need right now it's Norman Vincent Peale, so... save that "Everything's Gonna Be All Right" speech for someone else."
 Peale is referred to in the song "The John Birch Society" by the Chad Mitchell Trio ("Norman Vincent Peale may think he's kidding us along ... he keeps on preaching brotherhood, but we know what he means ...").
 In the "Treehouse of Horror VI" episode of The Simpsons, a building with the sign "Birthplace of Norman Vincent Peale" is destroyed.
 In the fourth episode ("The Bracelet") of the HBO show Curb Your Enthusiasm, Larry David calls Richard Lewis "Norman Vincent Lewis" after he says, "Every day is a great day for me."
 In the musical Li'l Abner, General Bullmoose is reminded to take his "Norman Vincent Peale pill", and declares he's "not taking those Peale pills anymore. They make me think too positive."
 In the graphic novel Watchmen, Adrian Veidt is described as being "a little Norman Vincent Peale" after a vague explanation of how he achieved success in wealth and fitness.
 Peale was profiled in an episode of the CNN series Race for the White House, entitled "John F. Kennedy vs. Richard Nixon".
 In Too Much and Never Enough, Mary L. Trump described Peale as a charlatan.
 In the video game Call of Duty: Modern Warfare II, players see the quote "It's always too soon to quit!" from Peale upon death. 

 Selected works 
 The Positive Power of Jesus Christ (1980) 
 Stay Alive All Your Life (1957)
 Why Some Positive Thinkers Get Powerful Results (1987). 
 The Power of Positive Thinking, Ballantine Books; Reissue edition (August 1, 1996). 
 Guide to Confident Living, Ballantine Books; Reissue edition (September 1, 1996). 
 Six Attitudes for Winners, Tyndale House Publishers; (May 1, 1990). 
 Positive Thinking Every Day : An Inspiration for Each Day of the Year, Fireside Books; (December 6, 1993). 
 Positive Imaging, Ballantine Books; Reissue edition (September 1, 1996). 
 You Can If You Think You Can, Fireside Books; (August 26, 1987). 
 Thought Conditioners, Foundation for Christian; Reprint edition (December 1, 1989). 
 In God We Trust: A Positive Faith for Troubled Times, Thomas Nelson Inc; Reprint edition (November 1, 1995). 
 Norman Vincent Peale's Treasury of Courage and Confidence, Doubleday; (June 1970). 
 My Favorite Hymns and the Stories Behind Them, HarperCollins; 1st ed edition (September 1, 1994). 
 The Power of Positive Thinking for Young People, Random House Children's Books (A Division of Random House Group); (December 31, 1955). 
 The Amazing Results of Positive Thinking, Fireside; Fireside edition (March 12, 2003). 
 Stay Alive All Your Life, Fawcett Books; Reissue edition (August 1, 1996). 
 You Can Have God's Help with Daily Problems, FCL Copyright 1956–1980 LOC card #7957646
 Faith Is the Answer: A Psychiatrist and a Pastor Discuss Your Problems, Smiley Blanton and Norman Vincent Peale, Kessinger Publishing (March 28, 2007),  (10),  (13)
 Power of the Plus Factor, A Fawcett Crest Book, Published by Ballantine Books, 1987, 
 This Incredible Century, Peale Center for Christian Living, 1991, 
 Sin, Sex and Self-Control, 1977, Fawcett (December 12, 1977)

 References 

Further reading
 
 
 
 
 Orwig, Sarah Forbes. "Business Ethics and the Protestant Spirit: How Norman Vincent Peale Shaped the Religious Values of American Business Leaders." Journal of Business Ethics'' 38, no. 1/2 (June 2002): 81–89. online

External links 

 

1898 births
1993 deaths
American Freemasons
American Methodist clergy
American sermon writers
American spiritual writers
American self-help writers
Boston University School of Theology alumni
Christians from Ohio
Christians from New York (state)
Critics of the Catholic Church
Methodist ministers
Ohio Wesleyan University alumni
Presidential Medal of Freedom recipients
People from Greene County, Ohio
Reformed Church in America members
Reformed Church in America ministers
People from Bellefontaine, Ohio